Alexei Viktorovich Tertyshny (born 27 March 1977) is a Russian former professional ice hockey winger and the current acting head coach of Traktor Chelyabinsk of the Kontinental Hockey League (KHL). He retired following the 2010–11 season played with Traktor Chelyabinsk of the Kontinental Hockey League (KHL).

Career statistics

References

External links

1977 births
Ak Bars Kazan players
Avangard Omsk players
HC CSKA Moscow players
HC MVD players
HC Sibir Novosibirsk players
Living people
Metallurg Magnitogorsk players
Russian ice hockey right wingers
Sportspeople from Chelyabinsk
Traktor Chelyabinsk players